The Sheffield Round Walk is a  walk through the south west of Sheffield, South Yorkshire, England. Starting from Hunters Bar, it travels along the Porter valley to Ringinglow. It then descends through the Limb valley and Ecclesall Woods to Abbeydale Road, before climbing through Ladies Spring Wood to Graves Park. The walk then passes through the Gleadless valley, Meersbrook Park and Chelsea Park before returning to Hunters Bar.

Round Sheffield Run
The annual Round Sheffield Run event follows the route of the Sheffield Round Walk. It is typically held on the last Sunday of June, and it is a fundraiser for the Weston Park Cancer Charity.

References

External links 
Sheffield Round Walk website

Transport in Sheffield

Geography of Sheffield
Tourist attractions in Sheffield
Footpaths in South Yorkshire